Brown Bay may refer to:

Brown Bay, U.S. Virgin Islands, a bay and former sugar cane and cotton plantation begun before 1800
Brown Bay, Antarctica